Christian Monacizzo (born April 5, 1991 in La Spezia) is an Italian professional football player who plays in the Lega Pro Prima Divisione for S.S. Tritium 1908, on loan from Atalanta. In the 2014-2015 season he plays for Sestri Levante, in Serie D.

External links
 
 fullsoccer.eu
 
 

1991 births
Living people
Italian footballers
Atalanta B.C. players
Association football midfielders